Permanent Revolution was a Trotskyist group formed in July 2006 by expelled members of the League for the Fifth International (L5I). It took its name from Leon Trotsky's theory of permanent revolution. The group dissolved itself on 28 March 2013.

History 
The group website carried publications with the same name from 1983-1994.
The group was founded after a two-year dispute against the perspectives adopted by the L5I at its 2003 congress. It first organised as a tendency, then as a faction.

The split followed a discussion of how to assess the impact, on class politics in general and the level of class struggle, of two changes:
 The effect of the restoration of capitalism in the former Union of Soviet Socialist Republics in 1990.
 The defeats of the working class movement in the 1970s–1980s, particularly in the United States and United Kingdom.

The group gathered together a minority which argued that almost without exception the international left had undertaken no serious reexamination of world perspectives and economy since a "stagnation phase" in the 1970s and 1980s. It felt that as a result the international left had been unable to explain either the marginalisation of the left or the failure of important protest movements against capitalism (such as the anti-capitalist movement, anti-war movement and Social Forum movements) to sink significant roots into the world working-class.

Permanent Revolution argued the L5I perspectives adopted at their Sixth Congress in 2003 that the engine of the world economy had "halted", that world capitalism was in a "period of stagnation" and as a result the world faced a "pre-revolutionary period" were fundamentally inaccurate and the refusal of the L5I to correct these perspectives in the light of experience proved they had decisively broken from the method of revolutionary Trotskyism. In contrast, Permanent Revolution argued that the integration of the former workers states into world capitalism, when combined with the defeats of the working class in the 1970s–1980s, had allowed capitalism to revive itself through globalisation.

Furthermore, it argued that while the working class movement was no longer in the counter revolutionary phase of the 1990s, the movement had still not fully recovered from those defeats and rather was in a transitional period, with uneven struggles, not yet usually generalised or sustained.

Theory 
Permanent Revolution claimed to stand in the tradition of Vladimir Lenin and Leon Trotsky and for the revolutionary programme developed by the early Comintern and the early Fourth International. However, it differed from other Trotskyist organisations in three ways:
 Permanent Revolution believed that Trotskyism requires a "perspective" as the most concrete assessment of the situation must be made in order to enable the application of revolutionary Marxist ideas to the real situation of the class struggle at any given moment. It emphasised Marx's view that it is necessary to understand the world in order to change it.
 Permanent Revolution considered the League for the Fifth International (LRCI) to have been a healthy period within Trotskyism and saw itself as following on from the LCRI which also argued that the Fourth International had degenerated after the Second World War because of a refusal to fundamentally reassess its perspectives. It felt that through a similar refusal the L5I suffered a similar process of disorientation and degeneration which culminated in the L5I abandoning the Trotskyist programme as a method of intervention into the actual class struggle.
 Permanent Revolution paid special interest to an analysis of how globalisation offsets the tendency of the rate of profit to decline and enables capitalism to escape the stagnation period which defined the world economy through the 1970s and 1980s.

Members 
At its inauguration in London in July 2006, Permanent Revolution claimed to have had 33 members. Its founding meeting involved participants from Britain, Ireland, Chile, Czech Republic, Sweden, Australia, Austria and observers from Argentina. A meeting in September 2006 agreed a Founding Statement which restates its intention to relaunch an international tendency committed to building a new Leninist Trotskyist International. Twenty-four British members were expelled from the L5I as well as four Australian members, several Irish members and one member from Sweden.

Dissolution 
In 2013, a dissolution statement was published on Permanent Revolution's website, stating that the left needs to organize itself in radically different ways, and maintenance of Permanent Revolution as a distinct group would interfere with those aims.

References

External links 
 Permanent Revolution Group website

Defunct Trotskyist organisations in the United Kingdom